The Apostolic Nunciature of the Holy See to India is the diplomatic mission of the Holy See to India, similar to an embassy. Archbishop Leopoldo Girelli was named Apostolic Nuncio by Pope Francis on 13 March 2021. He was formerly Apostolic Nuncio to Israel and Cyprus.

The Apostolic Nunciature to India is an ecclesiastical office of the Catholic Church in India, with the rank of ambassador. The nuncio serves both as the ambassador of the Pope (as head of State of Vatican City) to the President of India, and as delegate and point-of-contact between the Catholic hierarchy in India and the Pope (as head of the Church). The Apostolic Nuncio to India is usually also the Apostolic Nuncio to Nepal.

History
The diplomatic mission was established as the Apostolic Delegation to the East Indies in 1881, and included Ceylon, and was extended to Malaca in 1889, and then to Burma in 1920, and eventually included Goa in 1923. It was raised to an Internunciature by Pope Pius XII on 12 June 1948 and to a full Apostolic Nunciature by Pope Paul VI on 22 August 1967.  Ceylon (now Sri Lanka) was detached in 1967, Burma (now Myanmar) in 1973 and Malaca, as part of modern Malaysia, being detached in 1957.

List of papal representatives
Apostolic Delegates
Antonio Agliardi (23 September 1884 – 9 May 1887)
Andrea Aiuti (31 March 1887 – 24 July 1891)
Wladyslaw Michal Zaleski (15 March 1892 – 7 December 1916)
Pietro Fumasoni Biondi (15 November 1916 – 6 December 1919)
Pietro Pisani (15 December 1919 – 1924)
Edward Aloysius Mooney (18 January 1926 – 30 March 1931)
Leo Peter Kierkels, CP (23 March 1931 – 12 June 1948)

Apostolic Internuncios
Leo Peter Kierkels, CP (12 June 1948 – 29 June 1952)
Martin Lucas, SVD (3 December 1952 – 1 Jan 1957)
James Robert Knox (14 February 1957 – 13 April 1967)

Apostolic Pro-Nuncios
Giuseppe Caprio (22 August 1967 – 19 April 1969)
Marie-Joseph Lemieux, OP (30 May 1969 – 16 February 1971)
John Gordon (11 August 1971 – 11 June 1976)
Luciano Storero (14 July 1976 – 2 February 1981)
Agostino Cacciavillan (9 May 1981 – 13 June 1990)
Giorgio Zur (13 August 1990 – 7 December 1998)

Apostolic Nuncios
Lorenzo Baldisseri (19 June 1999 – 12 November 2002)
Pedro López Quintana (8 February 2003 – 10 December 2009)
Salvatore Pennacchio (8 May 2010 – 6 August 2016)
Giambattista Diquattro (21 January 2017 – 29 August 2020)
Leopoldo Girelli (13 March 2021 – present)

See also
 Holy See–India relations
 List of diplomatic missions in India

References

External links
 
 catholic-hierarchy.org 
 gcatholic.org 

Diplomatic missions in India
India
Catholic Church in India
Holy See
Holy See–India relations
Apostolic Nuncios to India